The Nathan Allen House is a historic house on Vermont Route 30 in Pawlet, Vermont.  Built about 1834, it is an excellent local example of a late Federal period farmhouse built in brick.  It was listed on the National Register of Historic Places in 1988.

Description and history
The Nathan Allen House stands on the west side of Vermont Route 30, a few miles north of Pawlet's central village, in the fertile plains on the east side of the Mettawee River.  It is a -story brick structure, with single-story wood frame ells attached to the right and rear.  It rests on a rubblestone foundation, and has trim elements of dressed marble and wood.  The main block is five bays wide, with a center entrance flanked by sidelight windows.  The left side wall is a reconstruction, the original having collapsed due to deteriorating condition in 1983.  The house has four side chimneys, and follows a center-hall plan inside.  The interior has seen a number of alterations and stylistic changes, but retains some of its original features, including a carved arch in the center hall, and a marble fireplace surround in one of the parlors.

The house was built about 1834 for Nathan Allen, a farmer who owned and worked the surrounding land (now in separate ownership).  It is one of two nearly identical houses built in this area; the other was built for Nathan's brother Elisha.  They are the only significant example of late Federal period architecture in the area.

See also
National Register of Historic Places listings in Rutland County, Vermont

References

Houses on the National Register of Historic Places in Vermont
Federal architecture in Vermont
Greek Revival architecture in Vermont
Houses completed in 1834
Houses in Rutland County, Vermont
Buildings and structures in Pawlet, Vermont
National Register of Historic Places in Rutland County, Vermont